A step sequence is a required element in all four disciplines of figure skating, men's single skating, women's single skating, pair skating, and ice dance. Step sequences have been defined as "steps and turns in a pattern on the ice". Skaters earn the most points in step sequences by performing steps and movements with "flair and personality", by turning in both directions, by using one foot and then the other, and by including up and down movements. 

Step sequences in pair skating should be performed "together or close together". Step sequences are required in the short programs, as prescribed by the ISU, for both senior and junior pairs teams, but are not required for their free skates. The step sequence must be "visible and identifiable", in any shape they like (oval, circle, straight line, or serpentine). The ISU defines a step sequence in ice dance as "a series of prescribed or un-prescribed steps, turns and movements in a Rhythm Dance or a Free Dance". Step sequences in ice dance have three divisions: types, groups, and styles.

Background 
A step sequence is a required element in all four disciplines of figure skating, men's single skating, women's single skating, pair skating, and ice dance. Step sequences have been defined as "steps and turns in a pattern on the ice". The ISU requires that all step sequences are performed "according to the character of the music" and short stops in accordance with the music are allowed. Skaters must fully use the ice surface and the turns and steps they perform throughout the sequence must be balanced in their distribution.

Gallery of turns used in step sequences

Single skating 
A step sequence in men's and women's single skating must have the following characteristics to earn the most points: the sequence must match the music; it must be performed effortlessly throughout the sequence, and have good energy, flow, and execution; and it must have deep edges and clean turns and steps. Also important but not required are the following characteristics: a sequence must have originality and creativity; the skater must have "excellent commitment and control" of their entire body; they must have good acceleration and deceleration during the sequence. Skaters earn the most points in step sequences by performing steps and movements with "flair and personality", by turning in both directions, by using one foot and then the other, and by including up and down movements.

Skaters can make short stops during a step sequence, but they must be performed in accordance with the music. They must also perform steps and turns that are balanced throughout the sequence. It is required that both junior and senior single skaters include a maximum of one step sequence in their free skating programs. Skaters can choose any kind of step sequence they wish and can include any unlisted jump, but they must fully use the ice surface. If a step sequence is barely visible or too short, it does not fulfill step sequence requirements. Unlisted jumps with any number of revolutions and listed jumps with at least one revolution can be included in the step sequence without penalties. If a listed jump performed during a step sequence has less than one revolution, the jump is not judged and the skater does not earn any points. As of 2022, skaters could include single jumps in their step sequences as choreographic elements without incurring a penalty. Also as of 2022, junior skaters were no longer required to perform a step sequence during their free skate programs; instead, they had to include a choreographic sequence because ISU officials wanted them to focus more on their program components.

Pair skating 

Step sequences in pair skating should be performed "together or close together". Step sequences must be a part of the short program. There is no required pattern, but pair teams must fully use the ice surface. The step sequence must be "visible and identifiable", in any shape they like (oval, circle, straight line, or serpentine). Step sequences can include any unlisted jump, regardless of the number of revolutions, and short stops, if they are done "in accordance with the music", are allowed.

All turns and steps must be performed on one foot, and they should have variety, which the ISU defines as at least nine difficult turns and steps executed by both partners. The ISU also considers simple variety in step sequences include at least seven difficult turns and steps and a minimum variety of at least five difficult turns and steps. The types of turns and steps can only be counted once per sequence. They must not separate, with no breaks, for at least half of the sequence. Changes of holds, which can include "a brief moment" when the partners do not touch, are permitted during the step sequence.

The workload between the partners must be even to help them earn more points. More points are rewarded to teams when they change places or holds, or when they perform difficult skating moves together. Teams also earn more points for the following: if they use difficult skating moves together and change holds and places during step sequences; if they execute rotations to either the right or the left, "with full body rotation covering at least one-third of the pattern in total for each rotational direction". Both partners must execute the combinations of difficult turns at the same time and with a clear rhythm and continuous flow, but without the free foot touching the ice, although they do not have to execute the same kind of turns. Partners can perform rockers, counters, brackets, loops, and twizzles during combinations of difficult turns. Three turns, changes of edges, jumps and/or hops, and changes of feet are not allowed, and "at least one turn in the combination must be of a different type than the others" 

Rotations to either the right or the left can be accomplished with any listed and unlisted steps and turns, as long as they are done continuously in one direction for at least 1/3 of the sequence and "then continuously for at least 1/3 of the sequence in the opposite direction (clockwise and anti-clockwise)". Rotations can also be performed throughout the length of the sequence the skaters are rotating with any unlisted and listed steps and turns they choose, for at least a third of the total sequence and at least a third of the total sequence in the opposite direction (also clockwise and anti-clockwise). Use of body movements is defined as the visible use by both partners any movements of the arms, and/or hips and/or legs and/or head and/or torso. These movements must affect the balance of the main body core, which affect the balance of the entire body and influence the balance on their blades.

Ice dance 

The ISU defines a step sequence in ice dance as "a series of prescribed or un-prescribed steps, turns and movements in a Rhythm Dance or a Free Dance". Step sequences have three divisions: types, groups, and styles.

There are two types of step sequences: not-touching or in hold. Not-touching step sequences must include matching and/or mirror footwork; both ice dancers must skate as close to each other as possible, not more than two arm lengths apart, without touching, except when they are skating turns and edges in opposite directions for short distances. The dancers can switch from mirror to matching footwork, and vice versa, and they can cross each other's tracings (marks made in the ice by the skates). Step sequences in hold must be performed in any dance holds or any variation of dance holds, and must not last over one measure of music.

Types of step sequences are separated into four Groups, based on their difficulty. Group A includes straight line step sequences: the midline, which is performed along the ice surface's full length, on its long axis; and the diagonal, which is performed from corner to corner, as fully as possible. Group B includes three curved step sequences. The circular, which is performed on the rink's entire width, on its short axis, can skated either clockwise or counterclockwise. The serpentine, which must be performed along the full length of the rink, can be done in either a clockwise or counterclockwise direction at the rink's long axis, at one end, and then progresses in either two or three S-shaped bold curves, ending up at the other end of the rink. Group C consists of partial step sequences: the pattern dance type sequence, which can be done anywhere on the ice and follows the chosen pattern dance; and the one foot step sequence, which is skated on one foot by each partner, separately, in hold, or at the same time. Group D consists of a combination step sequence, an element in which skaters must perform one-foot turns simultaneously but not touch each other, plus any step sequence in Groups A or B. Both juniors and seniors must include the combination step sequence in their free dances, but can choose any steps they like, as long as they are done simultaneously. The ISU describes and announces any variation of combination of Groups or the creation of other groups in an ISU Communication.

The ISU states the following about styles of step sequences: "Characteristics of Levels of step sequences, organized as styles, are technical requirements with ongoing validity and are published in an ISU Communication".

Footnotes

References

Works cited 

 "Special Regulations & Technical Rules Single & Pair Skating and Ice Dance 2022" (S&P/ID 2022). Lausanne, Switzerland: International Skating Union. 2022. Retrieved 16 September 2022.
 "Technical Panel Handbook: Pair Skating 2022/2023" (Tech Panel). Lausanne, Switzerland: International Skating Union. 15 July 2022. Retrieved 4 August 2022.

External links 
YouTube clip of Nathan Chen performing various short program step sequences.

Figure skating elements